All 14 universities in the Big Ten Conference operate business schools. Since 1992 they have organized an annual case study competition. On July 1, 2014, Rutgers University and the University of Maryland joined the Big Ten.

References

Big Ten
Business schools, Big Ten
Big Ten